"Angel Baby" is a song released in 1958 by Dean Martin. The song reached No. 30 on the Billboard Hot 100, No. 38 on "The Cash Box Top 75", and No. 23 on Canada's CHUM Hit Parade.

Chart performance

References

1958 singles
1958 songs
Capitol Records singles
Dean Martin songs